Lo Wu is the northern terminus of the  (Kowloon-Canton Railway) of Hong Kong, located in Lo Wu within the Closed Area on Hong Kong's northern frontier. The station serves as a primary checkpoint for rail passengers between Hong Kong and mainland China and vice versa, rather than serving a specific area. It is also the northernmost railway station in Hong Kong.

History

Initial opening
When the Kowloon–Canton Railway (KCR) first went into service, trains did not stop at Lo Wu, as there was no border patrol at the time. However, shortly after the People's Republic of China was created in October 1949, the KCR announced that trains would terminate at Lo Wu, and that passengers would be able to cross the border on foot.

After the economic reformation of China, through trains re-commenced running in 1979, and cross-border traffic increased substantially. During the 1980s, Lo Wu station was completely redeveloped. On 15 January 1987, the new Lo Wu station was formally opened.

Refurbishment work
Refurbishment work of the station started in 2002, and new facilities such as a group waiting area and new ticket gates were introduced. Since 28 December 2004, this station also serves as the interchange station for the Shenzhen Metro Luohu station, which shares the same Chinese name.

In 2009, platform gap fillers were trialled on platforms.

Closure during COVID-19
Following the Government's measures to contain the outbreak of COVID-19, this station was closed from 4 February 2020. This station provided 30-minute-interval train services between Lo Wu and Sheung Shui stations for Lo Wu residents only. This station remained closed to border crossing passengers as construction around the area was not  completed yet. Instead, from 8th January 2023, border crossing residents were asked to use Lok Ma Chau station instead.

Opening during Ching Ming and Chung Yeung Festivals
To make it easier to go to Sandy Ridge for grave sweeping, for a month around Ching Ming Festival and Chung Yeung Festival, some East Rail line trains operated to/from this station from the start of service until 7 pm every day.

Re-opening of station for Cross-Border Travel

Starting from the 6th of February 2023, the MTR resumed Cross-Border Travel with the Mainland at Luohu Port, with train frequencies ranging from four to eight minutes.

Station layout 
The station has three tracks. The other track serves intercity through train services which do not stop at this station and continues northward across the border into mainland China. The through trains do not have platforms on this station.

Platforms 
The East Rail station features two tracks with two side platforms and an island platform arranged in a Spanish solution. The island platforms (2 and 3) serve alighting passengers, while the side platforms (1 and 4) serve boarding passengers. The island platform connects to the arrivals concourse at L1, and the side platforms are connected to the departures concourse at L2. Both concourses are connected to the Lo Wu Control Point, through the Lo Wu Bridge which has moving walkways.

Trains entering the station will first open doors facing the island platform to allow passengers to alight. After station staff has confirmed that all passengers have alighted, the doors will close and doors facing the side platforms (1 and 4) will be opened for boarding passengers.

Prior to the implementation of the Spanish solution, passengers on both tracks would use the island platforms for both boarding and alighting, resulting in the platform overcrowding. In 2004, platform 1 (which had previously been rarely used) was rebuilt and platform 4 was constructed to improve the passenger flow for boarding passengers. 

Located inside the paid area of the arrivals concourse (L2) are two separate passageways providing access to escalators, lifts, and stairs to one of the two side platforms (1 and 4). Large glass sliding doors ahead of each passageway begin automatically closing around 5 minutes before the train is set to depart the station. This is done to control the number of boarding passengers allowed on each narrow side platform to prevent overcrowding and reduces the chance of passengers falling onto the tracks. Once a set of automatic doors are shut, the other set will open, allowing access to the other side platform.

Exits

The station has three exits:
 The Lo Wu Immigration Control Point, where passengers must go through the border checkpoint in order to enter mainland China. Passengers must have valid travel documents to use this exit.
 Two exits out to the Lo Wu area. These two exits are guarded by Hong Kong police officers. To use this exit, one must possess a Lo Wu Resident Card or a Closed Area Permit, which can be obtained at the Sheung Shui Police Station in Fanling.
 A1: Tak Yuet Lau, Liu Pok Village
 A2: Lo Wu Village, Sandy Ridge Cemetery

Incidents 
On 2 February 2020, 2 explosive devices were found at Lo Wu station.

See also 
 Lo Wu
 Lo Wu Bridge
 Lo Wu Control Point
 Luohu (Shenzhen side)
 Luohu station (Shenzhen side)

References

External links
 

MTR stations in the New Territories
East Rail line
North District, Hong Kong
Closed Area
Former Kowloon–Canton Railway stations
Railway stations in Hong Kong opened in 1949
1949 establishments in Hong Kong